Kosa Janjačka is a village in Perušić, Croatia. The population as of 2011 is 98.

References

Municipalities of Croatia
Populated places in Lika-Senj County